The Shangina (Şangin) is a river in Yakutia (Sakha Republic), Russia.

It is a right tributary of the Indigirka, flowing across the Middle Kolyma and Aby districts. The river usually freezes in early October and stays frozen until late May or early June.

History 
In the summer of 1870 the Shangina was explored by geographer and ethnologist Baron Gerhard von Maydell (1835–1894) during his pioneering research of East Siberia. After he charted the Suor-Uyata and Ulakhan-Sis ranges of the East Siberian Lowlands, Maydell reached the Indigirka.

Course 
The Shangina river begins in the northern part of the Alazeya Plateau. It heads first roughly eastwards then descends into in a wide floodplain where it heads northwestwards. There are many lakes in the middle and lower part of the basin. Finally the Shangina joins the right bank of the Indigirka  from its mouth. There are no inhabited places in its course.

Its main tributary is the  
long Ogustakh on the right.

See also
List of rivers of Russia

References

External links
Meteorological stations and hydrological gauges within the study basins

Rivers of the Sakha Republic